The Olympia Schwimmhalle is an aquatics centre located in the Olympiapark in Munich, Germany. It hosted the swimming, diving, water polo, and the swimming part of the modern pentathlon events at the 1972 Summer Olympics. At the Olympics, the stadium had a 9000-seat temporary capacity which was reduced to 1,500 soon after. During the 1972 Summer Olympics.In all,the 29 Olympic swimming events,all the Olympic Records were broken as well as the new 20 World Records were achivied.

Construction

The Schwimmhalle is unique for its roof construction, which is a lightweight stressed-skin structure. This curved structure bears loads through tension only, not compression. The double curvature in the roof design provides the support, which is further stabilized through pretensioned guy wires.

History
The Olympia Schwimmhalle is where swimmer Mark Spitz broke the record for most individual gold medals won in a single Olympics with seven gold medals. This record was not surpassed until fellow swimmer Michael Phelps won eight gold medals at the 2008 Summer Olympics in Beijing.

References
1972 Summer Olympics official report. Volume 2. Part 2. pp. 184–7.

External links

Sports venues in Munich
Venues of the 1972 Summer Olympics
Swimming venues in Germany
Olympic diving venues
Olympic modern pentathlon venues
Olympic swimming venues
Olympic water polo venues